Chilocorus is a genus of beetles belonging to the family Coccinellidae, subfamily Chilocorinae.

List of species
These species belong to the genus Chilocorus.
 Chilocorus bipustulatus (Linnaeus, 1758) - Heather ladybird 
 Chilocorus braeti Weise, 1895 - Cactus lady beetle
 Chilocorus cacti (Linnaeus, 1767)
 Chilocorus canariensis Crotch, 1874
 Chilocorus circumdatus (Gyllenhal in Schönherr, 1808) - Red chilocorus
 Chilocorus coelosimilis Kapur, 1967
 Chilocorus fraternus LeConte, 1860
 Chilocorus hauseri Weise, 1895
 Chilocorus hexacyclus Smith
 Chilocorus infernalis Mulsant, 1853
 Chilocorus kuwanae Silvestri, 1909 - Kuwana's lady beetle
 Chilocorus matsumurai Miyatake, 1985
 Chilocorus melanophthalmus Mulsant, 1850
 Chilocorus melas Weise, 1898
 Chilocorus nigritus (Fabricius, 1798) - Black chilocorus
 Chilocorus orbus Casey, 1899
 Chilocorus politus Mulsant, 1850
 Chilocorus renipustulatus (L.G. Scriba, 1791)
 Chilocorus rubidus Hope in Gray, 1831
 Chilocorus similis (Rossi, 1790)
 Chilocorus stigma (Say) - Twice-stabbed lady beetle 
 Chilocorus subindicus Booth, 1998
 Chilocorus tricyclus Smith
 Chilocorus tumidus Leng, 1908

References

 Biolib

Coccinellidae genera
Taxa named by William Elford Leach